Jordan Jay De Jong (born April 12, 1979) is an American former professional baseball relief pitcher. He became a free agent at the end of the 2008 season, following an ankle injury and three ensuing surgeries.

He is the cousin of pitcher Chase De Jong, who currently plays for the Pittsburgh Pirates.

External links

1979 births
Living people
American expatriate baseball players in Canada
Auburn Doubledays players
Baseball players from Iowa
Cal State Fullerton Titans baseball players
Dunedin Blue Jays players
Major League Baseball pitchers
Medicine Hat Blue Jays players
New Haven Ravens players
People from Orange City, Iowa
Peoria Javelinas players
Syracuse Chiefs players
Syracuse SkyChiefs players
Toronto Blue Jays players